The Aeolus AX4, formerly called the Dongfeng Fengshen AX4, is a subcompact crossover SUV produced by Dongfeng Motor Corporation under the Dongfeng Fengshen sub-brand.

Overview

The AX4 was positioned above the slightly longer AX3 subcompact crossover and below the much larger AX5 compact crossover. The Dongfeng Fengshen AX4 was unveiled on the 2017 Shanghai Auto Show with the market launch in September 2017.

Powertrain
The engines available for the AX4 is a 1.4 liter turbo engine with the maximum power of 103kW and peak torque of 196Nm, or a 1.6 liter engine with the maximum power of 91kW respectively and peak torque of 153Nm. The 1.4 liter turbo engine is matched with a 6-speed DCT gearbox, with 6.5 liter fuel consumption for 100 km; 1.6 liter engine is matched with 5-speed manual transmission or 6-speed DCT gearbox, with 5.9 liter fuel consumption for 100 km.

References

External links 

 Fengshen AX4 Official Website

2010s cars
Cars introduced in 2017
Cars of China
Crossover sport utility vehicles
Fengshen AX4
Front-wheel-drive vehicles
Mini sport utility vehicles